The Hellenic Actuarial Society (HAS,  (EAE)) is the association of actuaries in Greece. The society was established in 1979. It is a full member of the International Actuarial Association and the Groupe Consultatif. As of 2007, the society has about 100 full members. The current chairman of the society is Iraklis Daskalopoulos.

Past chairmen

 1979-1980 Ioannis Kalkanis
 1980-1991 Konstantinos Koutsopoulos
 1992-1995 Konstantinos Gionis
 1996-1999 Spyridon Grivogiannis
 2000-2003 Anastasios Pagonis
 Since 2004 Iraklis Daskalopoulos

External links

Hellenic Actuarial Society official website

Actuarial associations
Professional associations based in Greece